Thomas Reece Sargent III (December 20, 1914 – May 29, 2010) was a vice admiral and Vice Commandant of the United States Coast Guard.

Biography
Sargent was born on December 20, 1914 in London, England. He became a naturalized citizen of the United States in 1930. In 1933, he graduated from high school in New London, Connecticut. Later, Sargent graduated from Rensselaer Polytechnic Institute.

Sargent died on May 29, 2010. He is buried at Arlington National Cemetery.

Career

Sargent graduated from the United States Coast Guard Academy in 1938. He was then assigned to USCGC Tahoe.

During World War II, Sargent first served aboard .

After the war, he was stationed at the Coast Guard Academy. During the Vietnam War, he supervised the development and construction of LORAN transmitting stations in Thailand and Vietnam.

In 1968, Sargent was named chief of staff of the United States Coast Guard. He became assistant commandant of the Coast Guard in 1970. The title was changed to vice commandant in 1972. He remained in the position until his retirement in 1974.

During his career, he was awarded the Legion of Merit, the Bronze Star Medal, the Coast Guard Commendation Medal, the American Defense Service Medal, the American Campaign Medal, the European-African-Middle Eastern Campaign Medal, the Asiatic-Pacific Campaign Medal, the World War II Victory Medal, the National Defense Service Medal, the Philippine Liberation Medal and the Philippine Republic Presidential Unit Citation.

In a ceremony held November 9, 2017, Sargent was inducted into the United States Coast Guard Academy's 2017 Wall of Gallantry in recognition of distinguished acts of heroic service by a board of academy cadets.

Dates of rank

References

1914 births
2010 deaths
British emigrants to the United States
People from New London, Connecticut
United States Coast Guard admirals
Recipients of the Legion of Merit
United States Coast Guard personnel of World War II
United States Coast Guard personnel of the Vietnam War
United States Coast Guard Academy alumni
Rensselaer Polytechnic Institute alumni
Burials at Arlington National Cemetery
People with acquired American citizenship
People from Lake San Marcos, California
Vice Commandants of the United States Coast Guard